As of 2012, there were 7,755 farms in Massachusetts encompassing a total of , averaging  apiece, but by 2017 this had declined somewhat again, to 7,241 farms in the state. Greenhouse, floriculture, and sod products  including the ornamental market  make up more than one third of the state's agricultural output. Cranberries, sweet corn and apples are also large sectors of production. Massachusetts is the second-largest -producing (Vaccinium macrocarpon) state in the union after Wisconsin. Agriculture in the state is served and represented by the(MDAR).

 cultivation is an important part of the state's agricultural revenues. The  provides information to support growers.

An population in Boston that was detected in 2010 has since been successfully eradicated however.

Cover cropping has been successful elsewhere and can be used here. Akbari et al. 2019 finds that Winter rye (Secale cereale) and Hairy vetch (Vicia villosa) are effective covers for weed control in Massachusetts.

References 

Agriculture in Massachusetts